Arriva Poland Sp. z o. o. is a Polish private rail carrier providing services in the Kuyavian-Pomeranian, Masovian, Pomeranian and Warmian-Masurian voivodships. It is a subsidiary of Arriva.

History
The company was founded in 2006 as Arriva PCC, as a 50/50 joint venture between Arriva and PCC Rail. In December 2007, Arriva PCC commenced a contract to operate all non-electrified passenger lines in the Kuyavian-Pomeranian Voivodeship.

In June 2009, PCC Rail's share was included in its sale to Deutsche Bahn. In June 2010 Arriva bought Deutsche Bahn's shareholding and renamed the business Arriva RP. In December 2010 Arriva RP won a 10-year extension to its Kuyavian-Pomeranian Voivodeship contract.

In December 2013 Arriva RP commenced operating trains on four electrified lines in the Kuyavian-Pomeranian Voivodeship for two years with 12 existing trains. In September 2017, Arriva RP secured some open access paths in Poland.

Services
Arrive RP provides a regional passenger service in the Kuyavian-Pomeranian Voivodeship. Since December 2007, Arriva RP has run three main routes within the province, supplemented by a number of minor services. From 2009 to support the passenger traffic of the railway line No 207, Arriva RP began to run weekend trains between Bydgoszcz and Gdańsk. The holiday season also allows for seasonal connections to tourist destinations and seaside resorts in Pomerania and Warmia.

Routes operated
 Toruń Główny– Lipno – Sierpc
 Toruń Główny – Chełmża – Grudziądz
 Chełmża - Unisław Pomorski - Bydgoszcz Główny
 Laskowice Pomorskie / Wierzchucin - Szlachta - Czersk
 Bydgoszcz Główny - Wierzchucin - Tuchola - Chojnice
 Bydgoszcz Główny - Laskowice Pomorskie - Grudziądz -Jabłonowo Pomorskie – Brodnica

Rolling stock

References

External links

Arriva Group companies
Deutsche Bahn
Railway companies of Poland
Companies based in Warsaw
Polish subsidiaries of foreign companies
Polish companies established in 2007
Railway companies established in 2007
Polish Limited Liability Companies